The Tutupan Coal Mine is a coal mine located in South Kalimantan. The mine has coal reserves amounting to 3 billion tonnes of coking coal, one of the largest coal reserves in Asia and the world. The mine has an annual production capacity of 41 million tonnes of coal.

See also 
 Paringin coal mine - part of the same mine complex
 Wara coal mine - part of the same mine complex

References 

Coal mines in Indonesia